Siparuna is a genus of plants belonging to the family Siparunaceae. These aromatic evergreen trees and shrubs are found throughout the Neotropical realm. Over 70 species have been described.

Species
Species include:

Siparuna aspera
Siparuna calantha
Siparuna campii
Siparuna cascada
Siparuna cervicornis
Siparuna conica
Siparuna cristata
Siparuna croatii
Siparuna cuspidata
Siparuna decipiens
Siparuna echinata
Siparuna eggersii
Siparuna gentryana
Siparuna gesnerioides
Siparuna gigantotepala
Siparuna grandiflora
Siparuna guajalitensis
Siparuna guianensis
Siparuna harlingii
Siparuna hispida
Siparuna laurifolia
Siparuna lepidota
Siparuna lozaniana
Siparuna macrotepala
Siparuna multiflora
Siparuna muricata
Siparuna ovalis
Siparuna pachyantha
Siparuna palenquensis
Siparuna petiolaris
Siparuna piloso-lepidota
Siparuna poeppigii
Siparuna radiata
Siparuna reginae
Siparuna riparia
Siparuna sarmentosa
Siparuna schimpffii
Siparuna subscandens
Siparuna thecaphora
Siparuna vasqueziana

References

 Susanne S. Renner and Gerlinde Hausner. 2005. "Siparunaceae". Flora Neotropica Monograph 95. New York Botanical Garden Press. .
 Official Siparuna website

Siparunaceae
Laurales genera